Big Mouth Billy Bass is an animatronic singing prop, representing a largemouth bass, invented by Gemmy Industries on December 16, 1998; sold beginning January 1, 1999; and popular in the early 2000s.

Gemmy Industries
Gemmy (IPA) is an American novelty manufacturing company, best known for its animatronic and inflatable characters. It is currently headquartered in Coppell, Texas.  Founded in 1984, the company originally began producing ballpoint pens. Gemmy eventually ventured into novelty manufacturing, and in 2000, it achieved marketing success with the Big Mouth Billy Bass. Following that success, the company began predominantly making animatronic figures focused on the Christmas and Halloween seasons. The company distributes product internationally, especially to the United Kingdom.

Design and features
The fish is made of latex rubber with an internal plastic mechanical skeleton.  At first glance, the product appears to be a mounted game fish. The item was conceived by a Gemmy Industries product development vice president following his visit to a Bass Pro Shop.  The mounted fish turns its head towards a person, wiggles its tail on the trophy plaque, and sings cover songs, such as "Don't Worry, Be Happy" (1988) by Bobby McFerrin; and "Take Me to the River" (1974) by Al Green.  Green claims he received more royalties from Big Mouth Billy Bass than from any other recordings of the song.

The singing mechanism was originally activated by a motion sensor and was designed to startle a passerby.  Eventually, a button was added to activate it.  There have been many variants of Big Mouth Billy Bass produced by Gemmy.  These use different types of game fish and aquatic animals.  Variants include: Travis the Singing Trout, Cool Catfish, Rocky The Singing Lobster, and Lucky The Lobster.

Spin-offs and other versions
The concept was later adapted into a large mounted deer head, known as "Buck – the Animated Trophy" (voiced by Clint Ford), as well as a medium-sized mounted bear head.

On December 7, 1999, a special holiday version of the Big Mouth Billy Bass was released. The fish had a Santa hat on his head and a ribbon with a sleigh bell on his tail.  An anniversary edition followed in 2014.

In 2018, Gemmy Industries partnered with Amazon to create an Amazon Alexa-enabled version of the animatronic. This variant pairs with any Amazon Echo device through Bluetooth and will move its mouth when responding to Alexa commands. It also shakes its tail when playing music through Amazon Music but does not lip sync to songs. When not connected to an Alexa device, the fish sings an original song titled "Fishin' Time" when its red button is pushed.

A remake of the original Big Mouth Billy Bass was released in 2021. This new version cut "Don't Worry Be Happy" by Bobby McFerrin for Luke Bryan's 2015 "Huntin', Fishin' and Lovin' Every Day" in addition to the Talking Heads 1978 iteration of "Take Me to the River".

In late-2021, TikTok user Kevin Heckart hacked a Big Mouth Billy Bass to not only lip-sync to any voice track or song, but to also dance via head and tail movements to whatever song is played through any smart speaker connections. Heckart later made a similar hack to the Cool Catfish and Frankie the Fish by the same company along with Loftus International’s Tommy Trout as well as an orange Chinese Big Mouth Billy Bass 15th Anniversary Edition knockoff in mid-2022, all of them synced to an Amazon Alexa playing Nathan Evans's cover of The Wellerman.

In popular culture 
It was reported that Elizabeth II had a Big Mouth Billy Bass displayed on the grand piano of Balmoral Castle. The Netflix drama The Crown incorrectly depicts Prince Andrew giving it to her as a birthday present in 1997.

The success of the Big Mouth Billy Bass has led to a number of pop culture appearances, including product placements.  Some of the device's notable appearances include The Simpsons, Family Guy, The Sopranos, King of the Hill, WALL-E, and The Act of Killing.

References

External links 
 

Toy brands
1990s fads and trends
2000s fads and trends
Novelty items
Animatronic robots
Toy animals
Products introduced in 1999